55th Brigade or 55th Infantry Brigade may refer to:

 55th Indian Brigade of the British Indian Army in the First World War 
 55th Indian Infantry Brigade of the British Indian Army in the Second World War 
 55th Infantry Brigade (United Kingdom)
 55th Heavy Brigade Combat Team of the United States Army
 55th Sustainment Brigade (United States)
 55th Airborne Brigade of the Islamic Republic of Iran Army Ground Forces
 55th Paratroopers Brigade of the Israel Defense Forces
 55th Separate Motor Rifle Brigade - mountain troop of the Russian Army

See also

 55th Division (disambiguation)